Events in the year 1910 in Ireland.

Events
 8 January – Sinéad Flanagan married future Irish president Éamon de Valera in Dublin.
 21 February – Irish Unionist members of the Westminster Parliament elected Sir Edward Carson as party leader, replacing Walter Long.
 23 February – St Patrick's College, Maynooth, became a recognised college of the National University of Ireland.
 May – The Irish Countrywomen's Association was founded, as the Society of the United Irishwomen, by a group of educated and largely Protestant women in Bree, County Wexford.
 June – Bridget Dowling eloped to London with Alois Hitler, Jr., a kitchen porter at the Shelbourne Hotel, Dublin, and half-brother to Adolf.
 July – Irish republican and socialist leader James Connolly returned to Ireland from the United States.
 August – The first passenger flight in Ulster: Harry Ferguson piloted Miss Rita Marr.
 29 August – The Aero Club of Ireland held its inaugural aviation meeting at Leopardstown Racecourse.
 11 September – English-born actor-aviator Robert Loraine made an aeroplane flight from Wales across the Irish Sea but landed some 200 feet (60 metres) short of the Irish coast in Dublin Bay.
 20 October –  was launched at the Harland & Wolff shipyard in Belfast. At 45,324 gross tons, she was the largest ship afloat. Her sister ship  was launched 16 months later.
 November
 Reconstruction began of the original city bridge over the River Suir in Waterford; it was opened in 1913 by John Redmond.
 The Irish Republican Brotherhood monthly newspaper Irish Freedom began publication in Dublin.
 3 December – Sir Edward Carson and James Campbell were re-elected unopposed as Unionist Members of Parliament for Trinity College Dublin.
 The Non-subscribing Presbyterian Church of Ireland was created by merger of the Presbytery of Antrim and Remonstrant Synod of Ulster.
 Lilian Bland built and flew her own biplane glider, the first built in Ireland, from Carnmoney Hill; an engine was fitted soon afterwards and she made her first powered flight in late August.

Arts and literature
 13 January – The play Deirdre of the Sorrows by John Millington Synge (died 1909) was performed for the first time at the Abbey Theatre, Dublin.
 5 May – Padraic Colum's play Thomas Muskerry premiered at the Abbey Theatre.
 7 May – Annie Horniman withdrew financial support from the Abbey Theatre in protest at its refusal to close on the death of King Edward VII the previous day.
 August – The Kalem Company of New York began shooting the first of several films partly on location in Ireland, A Lad from Old Ireland, with a filming location around Beaufort, County Kerry, with Canadian Irish director Sidney Olcott. This was the first production by an American film studio to be shot outside the United States.
 September – Lord Dunsany's short story collection A Dreamer's Tales was published.
 3 November – The oldest céilí band in Ireland, The Kilfenora Céilí Band was founded in Kilfenora, County Clare.
 The Cork Public Museum opened.
 Terence MacSwiney's first play, The Last Warriors of Coole, was produced. 
 Ella Young's first book of stories, Celtic Wonder Tales, was published with illustrations by Maud Gonne.

Sport

Association football
 International
 12 February  Ireland 1–1 England (in Belfast)
 19 March  Ireland 1–0 Scotland (in Belfast)
 11 April  Wales 4–1 Ireland (in Wrexham)
   
 Irish League
 Winners: Cliftonville F.C.

 Irish Cup
 Winners: Distillery F.C. 1–0 Cliftonville F.C.

Births
 1 January – Charles Billingsley, cricketer (died 1951).
 2 January – Gearóid Ó Cuinneagáin, politician (died 1991).
 6 January – James "Lugs" Branigan, police detective and boxer (died 1986).
 16 January – William Bedell Stanford, classical scholar and senator (died 1984).
 29 January – Colin Middleton, artist (died 1983).
 10 April – Fintan Coogan Snr, Fine Gael party Teachta Dála (TD) (died 1984).
 13 April – Aloys Fleischmann, composer and musicologist (died 1992).
 9 May – Barbara Woodhouse, dog trainer (died 1988).
 20 May – Johnny Callanan, Fianna Fáil party TD (died 1982).
 5 June – Ham Lambert, cricketer and rugby player (died 2006).
 12 June – Bill Naughton, playwright and author (died 1992).
 27 June – Nicholas Mansergh, historian (died 1991).
 1 July – Dan Spring, Gaelic footballer, trade unionist and Labour Party TD (died 1988).
 4 July – George Otto Simms, Church of Ireland Archbishop of Dublin and Archbishop of Armagh (died 1991).
 1 August – Cathal Gannon, harpsichord maker and fortepiano restorer (died 1999).
 8 August – Bobby Kirk, ice hockey player (died 1970).
 14 August – Eddie Ingram, cricketer (died 1973).
 24 September – Robert Alexander, rugby and cricket player (died 1943).
 1 November – Michael Lyons, Fine Gael party TD and Senator (died 1991).
 15 November – Geoffrey Toone, actor (died 2005).
 19 November – Manliff Barrington, motorcycle racer (died 1999).
 26 November – Cyril Cusack, actor (died 1993).
 29 November – Máirtín Ó Direáin, poet (died 1988).
 10 December – Vivion de Valera, barrister, managing director of The Irish Press, Fianna Fáil party TD representing Dublin North-West (died 1982).
 22 December – James Boucher, cricketer (died 1995).
 26 December – Stephen Coughlan, Labour Party TD and Mayor of Limerick (died 1994).
 Full date unknown
 Peter Kavanagh, association football player (died 1993).
 Betty Miller, writer (died 1965).
 Séamus Ó Néill, writer (died 1981).

Deaths
 17 February – St. Clair Augustine Mulholland, American Civil War officer (born 1839).
 6 May – King Edward VII (born 1841).
 30 August – Hedges Eyre Chatterton, Conservative Party Member of Parliament and Vice-Chancellor of Ireland (born 1819).
 30 August – George Throssell, second Premier of Western Australia (born 1840).

References

 
1910s in Ireland
Ireland
Years of the 20th century in Ireland
Ireland